is an English trusts law case, concerning the certainty of subject matter in a trust.

Facts
The liquidator of Harvard Securities Ltd, a stockbroking company, applied under the Insolvency Act 1986 section 112 to determine whether the company or its clients held a beneficial interest in shares of which the company held possession. Harvard Securities business was buying blocks of Australian or US shares, which it sold onto clients in parcels. It retained legal title of the shares, as a nominee for each client. But the parcels were not registered individually in the names of the clients. The company then went insolvent. It was also necessary to determine the applicable law. If the clients had a beneficial interest in the shares, it meant that they would not be available for the liquidator.

Judgment
Neuberger J held that English law applied to the US shares (Australian law to the Australian shares, up to those sold after the 14 July), and the clients did have a beneficial interest, as there was no need to segregate the property. In principle, it was a valid declaration of trust to say that a percentage of shares would be held on trust, as in the Court of Appeal's decision in Hunter v Moss. But here, unidentified shares in a class were being treated as beneficial property. If the correspondence had specified the number of shares, there would have been a beneficial interest. Therefore the clients did have an interest in the US shares. The liquidator was at liberty to sell the shares and account to the former clients out of the net proceeds of sale, pro rata, to their respective interests. Australian law was different for the shares acquired before 14 July 1986. In the course of his judgment Neuberger J said the following.

See also

English trust law

Notes

References

English trusts case law
High Court of Justice cases
1997 in case law
1997 in British law